Martin Šlapák (born 25 March 1987) is a Czech footballer, who plays as a forward for Sokol Čížová.

Career
In 2019, Šlapák joined Sokol Čížová.

References

External links
 
 

1987 births
People from Beroun District
Living people
Czech footballers
Czech expatriate footballers
Association football forwards
1. FK Příbram players
FK Baník Most players
FK Železiarne Podbrezová players
FK Králův Dvůr players
Czech First League players
Czech National Football League players
Slovak Super Liga players
Bohemian Football League players
Expatriate footballers in Slovakia
Czech expatriate sportspeople in Slovakia
Expatriate footballers in Austria
Czech expatriate sportspeople in Austria
Sportspeople from the Central Bohemian Region